Nako Island is an island of Greenland. It is located in Baffin Bay in the Upernavik Archipelago.

Islands of the Upernavik Archipelago